Go-go dancers are dancers who are employed to entertain crowds at nightclubs or other venues where music is played. Go-go dancing originated in the early 1960s at the French bar Whisky a Gogo located in Juan-les-Pins. The bar's name was taken from the French title of the Scottish comedy film Whisky Galore!. The French bar then licensed its name to the very popular West Hollywood rock club Whisky a Go Go, which opened in January 1964 and chose the name to reflect the already popular craze of go-go dancing. Many 1960s-era clubgoers wore miniskirts and knee-high, high-heeled boots, which eventually came to be called go-go boots. Nightclub promoters in the mid‑1960s then conceived the idea of hiring women dressed in these outfits to entertain patrons.

Etymology
The term go-go derives from the phrase "go-go-go" for a high-energy person, and was influenced by the French expression à gogo, meaning "in abundance, galore", which is in turn derived from the ancient French word la gogue for "joy, happiness".  The term go-go dancer originated from the French bar Whisky a Gogo located in Juan-les-Pins, a seaside town near Cannes, which was among the first places in the world to replace live music with records selected by a disc jockey and to provide the spectacle of paid dancers known as go-go girls.

In the 1960s
On 19 June 1964, Carol Doda began go-go dancing topless at the Condor Club on Broadway and Columbus in the North Beach neighborhood of San Francisco.  She became the world's most famous topless and bottomless go-go dancer, dancing at the Condor for 22 years. In Canada, in 1966, Bonny Rush was mentioned as the country's first topless go-go dancer in the news media. In general, however, go-go dancers in the 1960s did not work topless.

In 1964 the Los Angeles-based club Whisky a Go Go began suspending go-go dancers above the audience in glass cages. Located on the Sunset Strip in West Hollywood, the club hired scantily clad dancers wearing knee-high vinyl go-go boots (or occasionally the Courrèges boots which inspired them) and mini skirts or mini flapper dresses. The club began to hire go-go dancers regularly in July 1965.

By early 1965 the concept of go-go cages had also become popular in Europe. In Germany, the discothèques Scotch Kneipe and Pussycat in Munich were the first to have go-go cages.

In 1967 an article in Newsweek estimated that there were 8000 go-go dancers working in the US, aged mostly between 18 and 21. In Canada in 1967, a club in Montreal's  York Hotel began to employ the city's first go-go dancers. Other Montreal venues followed, including bars, hotels, taverns and strip clubs. The dancers initially wore pasties but over the years the amount of nudity shown increased.

Television and media
Go-go dancers were employed as background dancers accompanying performances (real or lip-synced) by rock and roll bands on teen music programs in the mid-1960s. Hullabaloo was a musical variety series that ran on NBC from 12 January 1965 – 29 August 1966. The Hullabaloo Dancers—a team of four men and six women—appeared on a regular basis. Another female dancer, model/actress Lada Edmund, Jr., was best known as the caged "go-go girl" dancer in the Hullabaloo A-Go-Go segment near the closing sequence of the show. Other dance TV shows during this period such as ABC's Shindig! (16 September  1964 – 8 January 1966) also featured go-go dancers in cages. Sometimes these cages were made of clear plastic with lights strung inside of them; sometimes the lights were synchronized to go on and off with the music. Shivaree (syndicated, 1965-1966), another music show, usually put go-go dancers on scaffolding and on a platform behind the band which was performing. Beat-Club, a German show in the period, also used go-go dancers. Each show of the period had a particular method of bringing the go-go dancers into camera view.

British go-go dancer Sandy Sarjeant became popular performing on the ITV music show Ready Steady Go!.

The US TV crime drama series Honey West (1965–1966) included an episode called "The Princess and the Paupers" which featured a go-go dancing sequence.

Go-go dancing became the subject of 1960s pop songs such as Little Miss Go-Go (1965) by Gary Lewis & the Playboys and Going to a Go-Go (1965) by The Miracles.

In gay clubs

Many gay clubs had male go-go dancers, often called go-go boys, from 1965 to 1968, after which few gay clubs had go-go dancers until 1988, when go-go dancing again became fashionable at gay clubs (and has remained so ever since). Nowadays, gay male go-go dancers are a lot more popular and common in American culture, especially in bigger cities such as Los Angeles and New York. There are more gay go-go dancers than female go-go dancers in today's club scene, a big turnaround from the 1960s.

In the 1970s and after
During the 1970s discotheques became less popular and few nightclubs employed go-go dancers. Opportunities for go-go dancing work mainly continued at strip clubs where the audience was all male. Most of the strip clubs in the 1970s abandoned traditional burlesque striptease in favour of live sex shows and go-go dancing which was performed topless or naked.

However, in the late 1970s, there was a nightclub at 128 West 45th Street (the same location where the Peppermint Lounge had been) in Manhattan, New York City, called G.G. Barnum's Room, patronized largely by transgender women, that had male go-go dancers who danced on trapezes above a net over the dance floor.
In 1978, the Xenon night club in Manhattan became the first night club to provide go-go boxes for amateur go-go dancers to dance on.

In the early 1980s go-go dancing again became popular in New York City clubs inspired by the music of Madonna. Madonna included go-go dancers in her MTV music videos. By the late 1980s, go-go dancing had spread once more to nightclubs throughout the Western world.

During the 1980s go-go dancing continued in strip clubs and peep shows. Lawmakers in some jurisdictions passed regulations prohibiting nude dancing, requiring go-go dancers to wear pasties and a G-string. These laws were challenged under the First Amendment to the United States Constitution using the argument that naked go-go dancing qualifies as free speech. 

Musical styles such as techno, house music and trance music appeared during the 1990s as part of underground rave culture. As these styles became mainstream, an increase in the use of go-go dancing accompanied their rise in popularity. Dancers performing to these musical styles began to appear at music festivals and nightclubs to encourage the crowd to dance.

Today, go-go dancing has also found an outlet in mass media. Horrorpops, a Danish band, is known for featuring go-go dancers in their live performances and their music videos. The music video for "Horrorbeach" was dedicated entirely to the band's go-go dancers. Go-go dancers can be employed to enhance a band's performance, or a DJ's music mix.

In Russia, in the 2013 elections the Civilian Power party put forward four female go-go dancers as candidates for deputies.

American shows of the 1960s featured dancers that were highly trained, but many modern dancers are not always professional (for example some nightclubs in tourist areas in Magaluf or Ibiza). However there are many companies that supply professionally trained dancers to nightclubs for podium work around the world.

Holidays and celebrations
Currently, the City of West Hollywood celebrates the history and culture of go-go dancing by hosting an annual "Go-Go Boy Appreciation Day" that includes a street festival and competition.

Performance art dancers
Go-go dancers that are hired to dance at night clubs, special parties, festivals, circuit parties or rave dances in bright, colorful costumes are called performance art dancers. Most often, go-go dancers are typically women who perform to entertain a crowd in public or at clubs and they often wear sexy clothing or printed clothes. Their costumes often include accessories such as glow sticks, light chasers, toy ray guns that light up, go-go shorts embedded with battery-operated fiber optic tubes in various colors, strings of battery-operated colored lights in plastic tubes, fire sticks, a musical instrument, or an animal (usually a snake). In the early to mid‑1980s, the performance art dancer John Sex, who performed with a python, played a role in making go-go dancing popular once again at gay and bisexual night clubs along with his life partner Sebastian Kwok.

See also
Erotic dance
Fire performance
Go-go bar
Pole dance
Stripper

Film depictions
Faster, Pussycat! Kill! Kill! (1965)
Monster a Go-Go! (1965)
Girl in Gold Boots (1968)
Go Go Tales (2007)

References

External links

 "Sixties Dances and Dance Crazes" (the origin of go-go dancing)--with step-by-step instruction):
 Go! Go! Go! by Marie Menken (1964)

Erotic dance
1960s fads and trends